79 A.D. (also known as The Destruction of Herculaneum) is a 1962 Italian-French epic drama film written and directed  by Gianfranco Parolini and starring Brad Harris.

Plot

General Marcus Tiberius, the nephew of Emperor Titus Flavius, returns to Rome in triumph only to find it in turmoil. More and more people are being murdered on the streets, and nefarious members of the Roman Senate are blaming the Christian community. When Marcus is ordered to take action against the Christians, he refuses, so his uncle strips him of all his titles and sends him into exile. However, Marcus is determined to investigate the matter himself. Amidst all the love and intrigue at the emperor's court in A.D 79, a disaster is looming. In the shadow of the volcano, Mount Vesuvius, the city is about to be destroyed.

Cast
 Brad Harris as Marcus Tiberius 
 Mara Lane as  Diomira 
  Susan Paget as  Livia 
 Jany Clair as  Myrta 
 Jacques Berthier as  Tercius 
  Philippe Hersent as  Tito  Flavio 
 Carlo Tamberlani as  Furio 
   as  Claudia 
 Isarco Ravaioli as  Licinio 
  Djordje Nenadovic as  Samson 
  Niksa Stefanini as  Valerio  
 Vladimir Leib as  Lepido  
 Ignazio Dolce

References

External links

French disaster films
Peplum films
Italian disaster films
1962 adventure films
Films directed by Gianfranco Parolini
Films about volcanoes
Films set in the Roman Empire
Films set in 79 AD
Pompeii in popular culture
 
1960s disaster films
Sword and sandal films
French adventure films
Italian adventure films
1960s Italian films
1960s French films